Sympistis perscripta, the scribbled sallow moth is a moth of the family Noctuidae that is native to North America. It is listed as a species of special concern in the US states of Connecticut and Massachusetts. It was described by Achille Guenée in 1852. The larval hosts are Antirrhinum, Linaria, and Nuttallanthus.

References

perscripta
Moths described in 1852